The Jena-Auerstedt campaign order of battle is listed below. The order of battle includes units from the First French Empire and the Kingdom of Prussia that fought each other in the campaign that included the decisive Battle of Jena-Auerstedt on 14 October 1806. The order of battle may be useful to trace the battles of Schleiz and Saalfeld, which occurred before Jena-Auerstedt, as well as battles and capitulations that happened after 14 October, such as Erfurt, Halle, Prenzlau, Pasewalk, Stettin, Waren-Nossentin, and Lübeck.

French Grande Armée
Emperor Napoleon I 
 Chief of Staff: Marshal Louis Alexandre Berthier

Reserve Artillery
General of Brigade Boyvin de Lamartinière

Imperial Guard

Marshals François Joseph Lefebvre and Jean-Baptiste Bessières (8,725, 42 guns)
 Chief of Staff: General of Brigade François-Xavier Roussel
 Infantry Division: Marshal Lefebvre
 Brigade: General of Brigade Jerome Soules
 1st Chasseurs à Pied Regiment, 1st and 2nd battalions
 2nd Chasseurs à Pied Regiment, 1st and 2nd battalions
 Brigade: General of Brigade Pierre Augustin Hulin
 1st Grenadiers à Pied Regiment, 1st and 2nd battalions
 2nd Grenadiers à Pied Regiment, 1st and 2nd battalions
 Brigade: no commander
 1st Dragoons à Pied Regiment, 1st and 2nd battalions
 2nd Dragoons à Pied Regiment, 1st and 2nd battalions
 Cavalry Division: Marshal Bessières (2,862)
 Brigade: Colonel Nicolas Dahlmann
 Chasseurs à Cheval Regiment
 Mamelukes, one squadron
 Brigade: General of Division Frédéric Henri Walther
 Grenadiers à Cheval Regiment
 Gendarmes d'Elite, one squadron
 Artillery: General of Brigade Joseph Christophe Couin (712)
 1st Foot Artillery Regiment, 2nd and 6th companies
 6th Horse Artillery Regiment, detachment
 20 8-pound guns, 14 4-pound guns, and eight 6-inch howitzers

I Corps

Marshal Jean-Baptiste Bernadotte (21,163, 50 guns)
 Chief of Staff: General of Division Victor Leopold Berthier
 1st Division: General of Division Pierre Dupont de l'Etang (6,713, 12 guns)
 Brigade: General of Brigade Marie François Rouyer
 9th Light Infantry Regiment, 1st, 2nd, and 3rd battalions
 Brigade: General of Brigade François Marie Guillaume Legendre d'Harvesse
 32nd Line Infantry Regiment, 1st and 2nd battalions
 96th Line Infantry Regiment, 1st and 2nd battalions
 Artillery: Two 12-pound guns, eight 6-pound guns, two 6-inch howitzers
 1st Foot Artillery Regiment, 6th and 11th companies
 2nd Horse Artillery Regiment, 1st company
 2nd Division: General of Division Olivier Macoux Rivaud (5,776, 10 guns)
 Brigade: General of Brigade Michel Marie Pacthod
 8th Light Infantry Regiment, 1st and 2nd battalions
 Brigade: General of Brigade Nicolas Joseph Maison
 45th Line Infantry Regiment, 1st and 2nd battalions
 54th Line Infantry Regiment, 1st and 2nd battalions
 Artillery: Four 6-pound guns, four 3-pound guns, two 7-pound howitzers
 3rd Division: General of Division Jean-Baptiste Drouet (5,978, 16 guns)
 Brigade: General of Brigade Bernard-Georges-François Frère
 27th Light Infantry Regiment, 1st and 2nd battalions
 Brigade: General of Brigade François Werlé
 94th Line Infantry Regiment, 1st and 2nd battalions
 95th Line Infantry Regiment, 1st, 2nd, and 3rd battalions
 Artillery: Eight 6-pound guns, six 3-pound guns, two 6-inch howitzers
 Cavalry Brigade: General of Brigade Jacques Louis François Delaistre de Tilly (1,623)
 2nd Hussar Regiment, 1st, 2nd, and 3rd squadrons
 4th Hussar Regiment, 1st, 2nd, and 3rd squadrons
 5th Chasseurs à Cheval Regiment, 1st, 2nd, and 3rd squadrons
 Corps Artillery: General of Division Jean Baptiste Eblé (1,073 gunners and train)
 8th Foot Artillery Regiment, 6th company
 3rd Horse Artillery Regiment, 1st company
 Six 12-pound guns, six 3-pound guns

III Corps

Marshal Louis Nicolas Davout (28,936, 46 guns)
 Chief of Staff: General of Brigade Joseph Augustin Fournier, Marquis D'Aultanne
 1st Division: General of Division Charles Antoine Morand (9,867, 13 guns)
 Brigade: General of Brigade Jean Louis Debilly 
 51st Line Infantry Regiment, 1st, 2nd, and 3rd battalions
 61st Line Infantry Regiment, 1st, 2nd, and 3rd battalions
 Brigade: General of Brigade Étienne Brouard
 17th Line Infantry Regiment, 1st and 2nd battalions
 30th Line Infantry Regiment, 1st and 2nd battalions
 Brigade: General of Brigade Joseph Bonnet d'Honnières
 13th Light Infantry Regiment, 1st and 2nd battalions
 Artillery: Five 8-pound guns, seven 4-pound guns, one 6-inch howitzer
 7th Foot Artillery Regiment, 11th company
 2nd Division: General of Division Louis Friant (7,293, 8 guns)
 Brigade: General of Brigade Georges Kister
 33rd Line Infantry Regiment, 1st and 2nd battalions
 48th Line Infantry Regiment, 1st and 2nd battalions
 Brigade: General of Brigade Pierre-Charles Lochet
 108th Line Infantry Regiment, 1st and 2nd battalions
 Brigade: General of Brigade Louis Joseph Grandeau
 111th Line Infantry Regiment, 1st and 2nd battalions
 Artillery: Five 8-pound guns, two 4-pound guns, one 6-inch howitzer
 7th Foot Artillery Regiment, 2nd company (-)
 5th Horse Artillery Regiment, 2nd company (-)
 3rd Division: General of Division Charles-Étienne Gudin (8,473, 8 guns)
 Brigade: General of Brigade Claude Petit
 12th Line Infantry Regiment, 1st and 2nd battalions
 21st Line Infantry Regiment, 1st, 2nd, and 3rd battalions
 Brigade: General of Brigade Nicolas Hyacinthe Gautier
 25th Line Infantry Regiment, 1st and 2nd battalions
 85th Line Infantry Regiment, 1st and 2nd battalions
 Artillery: Five 8-pound guns, two 4-pound guns, one 6-inch howitzer
 7th Foot Artillery Regiment, 3rd company (-)
 5th Horse Artillery Regiment, 2nd company (-)
 Cavalry Brigade: General of Brigade Jean-Baptiste Théodore Vialanes (1,681)
 1st Chasseurs à Cheval Regiment, 1st, 2nd, and 3rd squadrons
 2nd Chasseurs à Cheval Regiment, 1st, 2nd, and 3rd squadrons
 12th Chasseurs à Cheval Regiment, 1st, 2nd, and 3rd squadrons
 Corps Artillery: General of Brigade Antoine Alexandre Hanicque (1,681 gunners and train)
 7th Foot Artillery Regiment, 2nd (-), 3rd (-), and 15th companies
 5th Horse Artillery Regiment, 1st company
 Six 12-pound guns, eight 8-pound guns, three 6-inch howitzers

IV Corps

Marshal Nicolas Soult (28,960, 52 guns)
 Chief of Staff: General of Brigade Jean Dominique Compans
 1st Division: General of Division Louis Vincent Le Blond de Saint-Hilaire (7,497, 12 guns)
 Brigade: General of Brigade Jacques de Candras
 10th Light Infantry Regiment, 1st and 2nd battalions
 35th Line Infantry Regiment, 1st and 2nd battalions
 Brigade: General of Brigade Louis Prix Waré
 43rd Line Infantry Regiment, 1st and 2nd battalions
 55th Line Infantry Regiment, 1st and 2nd battalions
 Artillery: Two 12-pound guns, eight 6-pound guns, two 6-inch howitzers
 5th Foot Artillery Regiment, 12th and 17th (-) companies
 2nd Division: General of Division Jean François Leval (10,176, 12 guns)
 Brigade: General of Brigade Joseph François Schiner
 24th Light Infantry Regiment, 1st and 2nd battalions
 Brigade: General of Brigade Claude François Ferey
 4th Line Infantry Regiment, 1st and 2nd battalions
 28th Line Infantry Regiment, 1st and 2nd battalions
 Brigade: General of Brigade Guillaume Raymond Amant Viviès
 46th Line Infantry Regiment, 1st and 2nd battalions
 57th Line Infantry Regiment, 1st and 2nd battalions
 Artillery: Two 12-pound guns, eight 6-pound guns, two 6-inch howitzers
 5th Foot Artillery Regiment, 13th and 17th (-) companies
 3rd Division: General of Division Claude Juste Alexandre Legrand (7,629, 12 guns)
 Brigade: General of Brigade François Ledru des Essarts
 24th Light Infantry Regiment, 1st and 2nd battalions
 Tirailleurs Corse, one battalion
 Tirailleurs du Po, one battalion
 Brigade: General of Brigade Victor Lavasseur
 18th Line Infantry Regiment, 1st and 2nd battalions
 75th Line Infantry Regiment, 1st and 2nd battalions
 Artillery: Four 12-pound guns, six 6-pound guns, two 6-inch howitzers
 5th Foot Artillery Regiment, 14th and 17th (-) companies
 Cavalry Brigade: General of Brigade Pierre Margaron
 8th Hussar Regiment, 1st, 2nd, and 3rd squadrons
 22nd Chasseurs à Cheval Regiment, 1st, 2nd, and 3rd squadrons
 Cavalry Brigade: General of Brigade Claude-Étienne Guyot
 11th Chasseurs à Cheval Regiment, 1st, 2nd, and 3rd squadrons
 16th Chasseurs à Cheval Regiment, 1st, 2nd, and 3rd squadrons
 Corps Artillery: Colonel Pierre-Elisabeth Peytes de Montcabrié (1,782 gunners and train)
 5th Foot Artillery Regiment, 16th and 17th (-) companies
 Eight 6-pound guns, two 6-inch howitzers

V Corps

Marshal Jean Lannes (21,744, 38 guns)
 Chief of Staff: General of Division Claude Perrin Victor
 1st Division: General of Division Louis Gabriel Suchet (11,436, 12 guns)
 Brigade: General of Brigade Michel Marie Claparède
 17th Light Infantry Regiment, 1st, 2nd, and 3rd battalions
 Brigade: General of Brigade Honoré Charles Reille
 34th Line Infantry Regiment, 1st, 2nd, 3rd, and 4th battalions
 40th Line Infantry Regiment, 1st, 2nd, and 3rd battalions
 Brigade: General of Brigade Dominique Honoré Antoine Vedel
 64th Line Infantry Regiment, 1st, 2nd, and 3rd battalions
 88th Line Infantry Regiment, 1st, 2nd, and 3rd battalions
 Artillery: Two 12-pound guns, six 8-pound guns, two 4-pound guns, two 6-inch howitzers
 5th Foot Artillery Regiment, 15th company
 3rd Horse Artillery Regiment, 3rd company
 2nd Division: General of Division Honoré Théodore Maxime Gazan (7,500, 16 guns)
 Brigade: General of Brigade Jean François Graindorge
 21st Light Infantry Regiment, 1st, 2nd, and 3rd battalions
 28th Light Infantry Regiment, 1st and 2nd battalions
 Brigade: General of Brigade François Frédéric Campana
 100th Line Infantry Regiment, 1st, 2nd, and 3rd battalions
 103rd Line Infantry Regiment, 1st, 2nd, and 3rd battalions
 Artillery: Two 12-pound guns, eight 6-pound guns, four 3-pound guns, two 6-inch howitzers
 1st Foot Artillery Regiment, 5th company
 6th Foot Artillery Regiment, 3rd company
 Cavalry Brigade: General of Brigade Anne-François-Charles Trelliard (1,680)
 9th Hussar Regiment, 1st, 2nd, and 3rd squadrons
 10th Hussar Regiment, 1st, 2nd, and 3rd squadrons
 21st Chasseurs à Cheval Regiment, 1st, 2nd, and 3rd squadrons
 Corps Artillery: General of Brigade Louis Foucher de Careil (1,128 gunners and train)
 1st Foot Artillery Regiment, 2nd company
 6th Horse Artillery Regiment, 3rd company
 Four 12-pound guns, four 6-pound guns, two 6-inch howitzers

VI Corps

Marshal Michel Ney (19,267, 24 guns)
 Chief of Staff: General of Brigade Adrien Jean Baptiste Dutaillis
 1st Division: General of Division Jean Gabriel Marchand
 Brigade: General of Brigade Eugène-Casimir Villatte
 6th Light Infantry Regiment, 1st and 2nd battalions
 Brigade: General of Brigade François Roguet
 39th Line Infantry Regiment, 1st and 2nd battalions
 69th Line Infantry Regiment, 1st and 2nd battalions
 76th Line Infantry Regiment, 1st and 2nd battalions
 2nd Division: General of Division Gaspard Amédée Gardanne
 Brigade: General of Brigade Pierre-Louis Binet de Marcognet
 25th Light Infantry Regiment, 1st and 2nd battalions
 Brigade: General of Brigade Mathieu Delabassée
 27th Line Infantry Regiment, 1st and 2nd battalions
 50th Line Infantry Regiment, 1st and 2nd battalions
 59th Line Infantry Regiment, 1st and 2nd battalions
 Cavalry Brigade: General of Brigade Auguste François-Marie de Colbert-Chabanais (944)
 3rd Hussar Regiment, 1st, 2nd, 3rd, and 4th squadrons
 10th Chasseurs à Cheval Regiment, 1st, 2nd, 3rd, and 4th squadrons
 Corps Artillery: unknown commander (1,323 gunners and train)
 Four 12-pound guns, 12 8-pound guns, four 4-pound guns, four 6-inch howitzers
 1st Foot Artillery Regiment, 9th, 10th, 11th, and 12th companies
 2nd Horse Artillery Regiment, 1st and 5th companies

VII Corps

Marshal Pierre Augereau (17,672, 36 guns)
 Chief of Staff: General of Brigade Claude Marie Joseph Pannetier
 1st Division: General of Division Jacques Desjardin (8,242, 8 guns)
 Brigade: General of Brigade Pierre Belon Lapisse
 16th Light Infantry Regiment, 1st, 2nd, 3rd, and 4th battalions
 Brigade: General of Brigade Jacques Lefranc
 14th Light Infantry Regiment, 2nd battalion
 44th Line Infantry Regiment, 1st, 2nd, and 3rd battalions
 105th Line Infantry Regiment, 1st, 2nd, and 3rd battalions
 Artillery: Two 12-pound guns, four 6-pound guns, two 6-inch howitzers
 3rd Foot Artillery Regiment, 4th company
 6th Horse Artillery Regiment, 2nd company (-)
 2nd Division: General of Division Étienne Heudelet de Bierre
 Brigade: General of Brigade François Pierre Joseph Amey
 7th Light Infantry Regiment, 1st, 2nd, and 3rd battalions
 Brigade: General of Brigade Jacques Thomas Sarrut
 24th Line Infantry Regiment, 1st, 2nd, and 3rd battalions
 63rd Line Infantry Regiment, 1st and 2nd battalions
 Brigade: unknown
 Hesse-Darmstadt Fusilier Regiment, 1st and 2nd battalions
 Nassau Infantry Regiment, 3rd battalion
 Artillery: Two 12-pound guns, four 6-pound guns, two 6-inch howitzers
 3rd Foot Artillery Regiment, 3rd company
 6th Horse Artillery Regiment, 2nd company (-)
 Cavalry Brigade: General of Brigade Antoine Jean Auguste Durosnel (1,290, 4 guns)
 7th Chasseurs à Cheval Regiment, 1st, 2nd, 3rd, and 4th squadrons
 20th Chasseurs à Cheval Regiment, 1st, 2nd, and 3rd squadrons
 6th Horse Artillery Regiment, 5th company, four 4-pound guns
 Corps Artillery: unknown commander (1,323 gunners and train)
 Four 12-pound guns, 12 8-pound guns, four 4-pound guns, four 6-inch howitzers
 1st Foot Artillery Regiment, 9th, 10th, 11th, and 12th companies
 2nd Horse Artillery Regiment, 1st and 5th companies

Reserve Cavalry

Marshal Joachim Murat (19,629, 26 guns)
 Chief of Staff: General of Brigade Augustin Daniel Belliard
 1st Cuirassier Division: General of Division Étienne Marie Antoine Champion de Nansouty (2,987, 3 guns)
 Brigade: General of Brigade Jean-Marie Defrance
 1e Régiment des Carabinier, 1st, 2nd, 3rd, and 4th squadrons
 2ème Régiment des Carabinier, 1st, 2nd, 3rd, and 4th squadrons
 Brigade: General of Brigade Armand Lebrun de La Houssaye
 2nd Cuirassier Regiment, 1st, 2nd, 3rd, and 4th squadrons
 9th Cuirassier Regiment, 1st, 2nd, 3rd, and 4th squadrons
 Brigade: General of Brigade Antoine-Louis Decrest de Saint-Germain
 3rd Cuirassier Regiment, 1st, 2nd, 3rd, and 4th squadrons
 12th Cuirassier Regiment, 1st, 2nd, 3rd, and 4th squadrons
 Artillery: 2nd Horse Artillery, 4th company (-), two 6-pound guns, one 6-inch howitzer
 2nd Cuirassier Division: General of Division Jean-Joseph Ange d'Hautpoul (1,927, 3 guns)
 Brigade: General of Brigade Jean Christophe Collin Verdière
 1st Cuirassier Regiment, 1st, 2nd, 3rd, and 4th squadrons
 5th Cuirassier Regiment, 1st, 2nd, 3rd, and 4th squadrons
 Brigade: General of Brigade Raymond-Gaspard de Bonardi de Saint-Sulpice
 10th Cuirassier Regiment, 1st, 2nd, 3rd, and 4th squadrons
 Artillery: 2nd Horse Artillery, 4th company (-), two 6-pound guns, one 6-inch howitzer

 1st Dragoon Division: General of Division Louis Klein (2,401, 3 guns)
 Brigade: General of Brigade Jacques Étienne de Fornier Fénerolz
 1st Dragoon Regiment, 1st, 2nd, and 3rd squadrons
 2nd Dragoon Regiment, 1st, 2nd, and 3rd squadrons
 Brigade: General of Brigade Auguste Étienne Lamotte
 4th Dragoon Regiment, 1st, 2nd, 3rd, and 4th squadrons
 14th Dragoon Regiment, 1st, 2nd, 3rd, and 4th squadrons
 Brigade: General of Brigade Joseph Denis Picard
 20th Dragoon Regiment, 1st, 2nd, and 3rd squadrons
 26th Dragoon Regiment, 1st, 2nd, and 3rd squadrons
 Artillery: 2nd Horse Artillery, 2nd company (-), two 8-pound guns, one 6-inch howitzer
 2nd Dragoon Division: General of Division Emmanuel Grouchy (2,915, 3 guns)
 Brigade: General of Brigade Mansuy Dominique Roget
 3rd Dragoon Regiment, 1st, 2nd, and 3rd squadrons
 4th Dragoon Regiment, 1st, 2nd, and 3rd squadrons
 Brigade: General of Brigade Jacques Louis François Milet
 10th Dragoon Regiment, 1st, 2nd, and 3rd squadrons
 11th Dragoon Regiment, 1st, 2nd, and 3rd squadrons
 Brigade: General of Brigade André Joseph Boussart
 13th Dragoon Regiment, 1st, 2nd, and 3rd squadrons
 22nd Dragoon Regiment, 1st, 2nd, and 3rd squadrons
 Artillery: 2nd Horse Artillery, 2nd company (-), two 8-pound guns, one 6-inch howitzer
 3rd Dragoon Division: General of Division Marc Antoine de Beaumont (3,055, 3 guns)
 Brigade: General of Brigade Charles Joseph Boyé
 5th Dragoon Regiment, 1st, 2nd, 3rd, and 4th squadrons
 8th Dragoon Regiment, 1st, 2nd, 3rd, and 4th squadrons
 Brigade: General of Brigade Frédéric Christophe Marizy
 12th Dragoon Regiment, 1st, 2nd, 3rd, and 4th squadrons
 16th Dragoon Regiment, 1st, 2nd, 3rd, and 4th squadrons
 Brigade: General of Brigade Marie Victor de Fay, marquis de Latour-Maubourg
 9th Dragoon Regiment, 1st, 2nd, 3rd, and 4th squadrons
 21st Dragoon Regiment, 1st, 2nd, 3rd, and 4th squadrons
 Artillery: 2nd Horse Artillery, 3rd company (-), two 8-pound guns, one 6-inch howitzer

 4th Dragoon Division: General of Division Louis Michel Antoine Sahuc (3,129, 3 guns)
 Brigade: General of Brigade Pierre Margaron
 17th Dragoon Regiment, 1st, 2nd, and 3rd squadrons
 27th Dragoon Regiment, 1st, 2nd, and 3rd squadrons
 Brigade: General of Brigade Jacques Léonard Laplanche
 18th Dragoon Regiment, 1st, 2nd, and 3rd squadrons
 19th Dragoon Regiment, 1st, 2nd, and 3rd squadrons
 Brigade: unknown commander
 15th Dragoon Regiment, 1st, 2nd, and 3rd squadrons
 25th Dragoon Regiment, 1st, 2nd, and 3rd squadrons
 Artillery: 6th Horse Artillery, 4th company (-), two 8-pound guns, one 6-inch howitzer
 Light Cavalry Division: General of Brigade Antoine Lasalle
 Light Cavalry Brigade: General of Brigade Lasalle
 5th Hussar Regiment, 1st, 2nd, and 3rd squadrons
 7th Hussar Regiment, 1st, 2nd, and 3rd squadrons
 Light Cavalry Brigade: General of Brigade Édouard Jean Baptiste Milhaud
 1st Hussar Regiment, 1st, 2nd, and 3rd squadrons
 13th Chasseurs à Cheval Regiment, 1st, 2nd, and 3rd squadrons

Prussian Army
Commander-in-chief: King Frederick William III of Prussia
 Chief of Staff General-Major Karl Ludwig von Phull
Second-in-command: Feldmarschall Charles William Ferdinand, Duke of Brunswick
 Chief of Staff: Oberst (Colonel) Gerhard von Scharnhorst
 Unless otherwise noted, regimental guns are not included in the Prussian gun totals.
 When two generals with the same name are candidates for a brigade command, Millar is cited.

Brunswick's Main Army

Duke of Brunswick
 Advance Guard Division: General-Leutnant Gebhard Leberecht von Blücher
 Strength: 6,000 total, 2,350 infantry, 3,500 cavalry, 150 gunners, 14 guns
 Brigade: General-Major Friedrich Gottlieb von Oswald (2,350, 6 regimental guns)
 Weimar Fusilier Battalion
 Greiffenberg Fusilier Battalion # 4
 Oswald Fusilier Battalion # 14
 Kloch Fusilier Battalion # 18
 Cavalry Brigade: Blücher (3,500, 8 guns)
 Württemberg Hussar Regiment # 4, ten squadrons
 Blücher Hussar Regiment # 8, ten squadrons
 Irwing Dragoon Regiment # 3, five squadrons
 Schorlemmer Horse Artillery Battery, eight guns
 1st Division: General-Leutnant Prince William of Orange
 Strength: 9,200 total, 7,300 infantry, 1,700 cavalry, 200 gunners, 18 guns
 Brigade: Oberst Prince Henry
 Rheinbaben Grenadier Battalion
 Prince Ferdinand Infantry Regiment # 34, two battalions
 Puttkammer Infantry Regiment # 36, two battalions
 Riemer Foot Artillery Battery, six 6-pound guns
 Brigade: Oberst Johann Adolf von Lützow
 Knebel Grenadier Battalion
 Möllendorf Infantry Regiment # 25, two battalions
 Wartensleben Infantry Regiment # 59, two battalions
 Lehmann Foot Artillery Battery, six 6-pound guns
 Cavalry Brigade: Oberstleutnant Prince Wilhelm of Prussia
 Leib Carabinier Regiment # 12, five squadrons
 Garde du Corps Cuirassier Regiment # 14, five squadrons
 Willmann Horse Artillery Battery, six 4-pound guns
 2nd Division: General-Leutnant Leopold Alexander von Wartensleben
 Strength: 10,300 total, 8,300 infantry, 1,800 cavalry, 200 gunners, 18 guns
 Brigade: General-Major Karl Alexander von Wedel
 Hanstein Grenadier Battalion
 Renouard Infantry Regiment # 3, two battalions
 Kleist Infantry Regiment # 5, two battalions
 Wilkins Foot Artillery battery, six 8-pound guns
 Brigade: General-Major Johann Jeremias von Renouard
 Alt-Braun Grenadier Battalion
 Prince Louis Infantry Regiment # 20, two battalions
 Brunswick Infantry Regiment # 21, two battalions
 Lange Foot Artillery Battery, six 8-pound guns
 Cavalry Brigade: General-Major Christan Heinrich von Quitzow (1,800, 6 guns)
 Quitzow Cuirassier Regiment # 6, five squadrons
 Reitzenstein Cuirassier Regiment # 7, five squadrons
 Merkatz Horse Artillery Battery, six 4-pound guns
 3rd Division: General-Leutnant Friedrich Wilhelm Carl von Schmettau  (vice Scharnhorst)
 Strength: 11,500 total, 8,600 infantry, 2,700 cavalry, 200 gunners, 18 guns
 Brigade: General-Major Ludolph August Friedrich von Alvensleben
 Schack Grenadier Battalion
 Alvensleben Infantry Regiment # 33, two battalions
 Prince Heinrich Infantry Regiment # 35, two battalions
 Röhl Foot Artillery Battery, six 8-pound guns
 Brigade: General-Major Dietrich Lebrecht von Schimonsky
 Krafft Grenadier Battalion
 Malschitsky Infantry Regiment # 28, two battalions
 Schimonsky Infantry Regiment # 40, two battalions
 Stankar Foot Artillery Battery, six 8-pound guns
 Cavalry Brigade: General-Major Friedrich Daniel Wilhelm von Irwing
 Königin Dragoon Regiment # 5, ten squadrons
 Graumann Horse Artillery Battery, six guns
 Cavalry Brigade: General-Major Karl Wilhelm von Bünting
 Heising Cuirassier Regiment # 8, five squadrons
 Bünting Cuirassier Regiment # 12, five squadrons

Kalckreuth's Reserve Corps

General of Infantry Friedrich Adolf, Count von Kalckreuth
 Strength: 15,750 total, 13,000 infantry, 2,550 cavalry, 200 gunners, 31 guns
 The Reserve Corps was attached to the Main Army.
 1st Division: General-Leutnant Johann Ernst von Kühnheim
 Strength: 7,400 total, 2,550 cavalry, 15 guns
 Brigade: Oberst August Wilhelm von Pletz
 Rabiel Grenadier battalion
 Prince August Grenadier battalion
 König Infantry Regiment # 18, two battalions
 Alkier Howitzer Battery, six 6-inch howitzers
 Brigade: General-Major Karl Friedrich von Hirschfeld
 Grenadier Garde Infantry Regiment # 6, one battalion
 Leib Garde Battalion
 Guard Infantry Regiment # 15, two battalions
 Faber Foot Artillery Battery, three 8-pound guns
 Cavalry Brigade: Oberst Karl Friedrich Hermann von Beeren
 Beeren Cuirassier Regiment # 2, five squadrons
 Gensdarmes Cuirassier Regiment # 10, five squadrons
 Garde du Corps Cuirassier Regiment # 13, five squadrons
 Scholten Horse Artillery Battery, six 4-pound guns
 2nd Division: General-Leutnant Alexander Wilhelm von Arnim
 Strength: 8,800 total, 16 guns
 Brigade: General-Major Johann Matthias von Malschitsky
 Schlieffen Grenadier battalion
 Hülsen Grenadier battalion
 Zenge Infantry Regiment # 24, two battalions
 Bychelberg Foot Artillery Battery, eight 8-pound guns
 Brigade: General-Major 
 Gaudy Grenadier battalion
 Osten Grenadier battalion
 Arnim Infantry Regiment # 13, two battalions
 Pirch Infantry Regiment # 22, two battalions
 Heiden Foot Artillery Battery, eight 8-pound guns

Hohenlohe's Army
 General of Infantry Frederick Louis, Prince of Hohenlohe-Ingelfingen
 Chief of Staff: Oberst Christian Karl August Ludwig von Massenbach
 Advance Guard Division: General-Leutnant Prince Louis Ferdinand  (vice Grawert)
 Strength: 8,300 at Saalfeld, 5,300 at Jena, 33 of 44 guns lost at Saalfeld including regimental guns
 Brigade: General-Major 
 Müffling Infantry Regiment # 49, two battalions
 Prince Clemens Saxon Infantry Regiment, two battalions
 Kürfurst Saxon Infantry Regiment, two battalions
 Hoyer Foot Artillery Battery, six 4-pound guns
 Brigade: General-Major 
 Rabenau Fusilier Battalion # 13
 Pelet Fusilier Battalion # 14
 Rühle Fusilier Battalion # 15
 Masars and Valentin Foot Jäger companies
 Reimann Foot Artillery Battery, six 6-pound guns
 Cavalry Brigade: General-Major 
 Schimmelpfennig Hussar Regiment # 6, ten squadrons
 Gause Horse Artillery Battery # 2, eight 6-pound guns
 Cavalry Brigade: General-Major 
 Saxon Hussar Regiment, eight squadrons
 1st Division: General-Leutnant Julius von Grawert
 Strength: 9,630 total, 7,500 infantry, 1,900 cavalry, 230 gunners, 22 guns
 Brigade: General-Major Johann Friedrich Wilhelm von Müffling
 Hahn Grenadier battalion (29/32)
 Hohenlohe Infantry Regiment # 32, two battalions
 Sanitz Infantry Regiment # 50, two battalions
 Giasenapp Foot Artillery battery # 7, six 12-pound guns
 Brigade: General-Major Christian Friedrich von Schimonsky
 Sack Grenadier battalion (33/42)
 Grawert Infantry Regiment # 37, two battalions
 Zastrow Infantry Regiment # 39, two battalions
 Wolframsdorf Foot Artillery battery # 8, six 12-pound guns
 Cavalry: General-Leutnant Friedrich Jacob von Holtzendorff
 Cavalry Brigade: General-Major Elias Maximilian von Henckel
 Krafft Dragoon Regiment # 11, five squadrons
 Henkel Cuirassier Regiment # 1, five squadrons
 Holtzendorff Cuirassier Regiment # 9, five squadrons
 Steinwehr Horse Artillery battery # 9, six 6-pound guns
 Light Brigade: Oberst von Erichsen
 Erichsen Fusilier battalion # 10
 Gettkandt Hussar Regiment # 1, ten squadrons
 Studnitz Prussian Horse Artillery battery # 14 (-), four 4-pound guns
 2nd (Saxon) Division: General der Kavallerie Hans Gottlob von Zeschwitz
 Strength: 9,750 total, 8,200 infantry, 1,250 cavalry, 300 gunners, 41 guns
 Brigade: General-Major von Burgsdorff
 Thümmel Saxon Infantry Regiment, two battalions
 Prince Xavier Saxon Infantry Regiment, two battalions
 Haussmar Saxon Foot Artillery battery, eight 12-pound guns
 Ernst Saxon Foot Artillery battery, eight 12-pound guns
 Brigade: General-Major von Dyherrn
 Low Saxon Infantry Regiment, two battalions
 Niesemeuschel Saxon Infantry Regiment, two battalions
 Bevilaqua Saxon Infantry Regiment, 2nd battalion
 Bonniot Saxon Foot Artillery battery # 8, ten 12-pound guns
 Cavalry Brigade: General-Leutnant von Kochtitsky (General-Leutnant Joachim Friedrich von Zeschwitz)
 Mounted Carabinier Saxon Regiment, four squadrons
 Kochtitsky Saxon Cuirassier Regiment, four squadrons
 Prince Albert Saxon Chevau-léger Regiment, four squadrons
 Grossman Saxon Horse Artillery battery, ten guns
 Light Brigade: General-Leutnant von Polenz (Oberst Karl Anton Andreas von Boguslawsky)
 Boguslawsky Prussian Fusilier battalion # 22
 Polenz Saxon Chevau-léger Regiment, four squadrons
 Studnitz Prussian Horse Artillery battery # 14 (-), five guns
 Reserve Division: General-Leutnant Wolfgang Moritz von Prittwitz
 8,090 total, 6,900 infantry, 1,000 cavalry, 190 gunners, 23 guns in batteries
 Brigade: General-Major Karl Wilhelm von Sanitz
 Losthin Grenadier Battalion (38/49)
 Dohna Grenadier Battalion (40/43)
 Borck Grenadier Battalion (28/50)
 Kollin Grenadier Battalion (39)
 Schulenburg Foot Artillery Battery, eight 12-pound guns
 Brigade: General-Major Heinrich von Cerrini di Monte Varchi
 Thiolaz Saxon Grenadier Battalion
 Lecoq Saxon Grenadier Battalion
 Liechtenhayr Saxon Grenadier Battalion
 Metzsch Saxon Grenadier Battalion
 Hundt Saxon Grenadier Battalion
 Tullmar Foot Artillery Battery, eight guns
 Brigade: General-Major August Friedrich Erdmann von Krafft (1,000, 7 guns)
 Prittwitz Dragoon Regiment # 2, five squadrons
 Prince Johann Saxon Chevau-léger Regiment, four squadrons
 Hahn Horse Artillery Battery, seven guns
 Left Flank Corps: General-Major Bogislav Friedrich Emanuel von Tauentzien
 Strength: 6,300 total, 6 guns
 Brigade: General-Major Johann Christian von Zweiffel
 Herewarth Grenadier Battalion
 Zweiffel Infantry Regiment # 46, two battalions
 Brigade: General-Major von Schöneberg
 Winkel Saxon Grenadier Battalion
 Rechten Saxon Infantry Regiment, two battalions
 Prince Maximililan Saxon Infantry Regiment, two battalions
 Kotsch Howitzer Battery, six howitzers
 Light Brigade: General-Major Rudolph Ernst Christoph von Bila
 Rosen Fusilier Battalion # 7
 Werner and Kronheim Foot Jäger companies
 Prince Clement Saxon Chevau-léger Regiment, four squadrons
 Bila Hussar Regiment # 11, five squadrons

Rüchel's Corps
General of Infantry Ernst von Rüchel
 Strength: 15,000 total, 12,700 infantry, 2,300 cavalry, 450 gunners, 40 guns
 Generals Winning and Saxe-Weimar both missed Jena-Auerstedt while on detached duty.
 Advance Guard Division: General-Leutnant Christian Ludwig von Winning
 Brigade: Winning
 Kaiserlingk Fusilier Battalion # 1
 Bila Fusilier Battalion # 2
 Tschammer Infantry Regiment # 27, two battalions
 Two Foot Jäger companies
 6-pounder Foot Artillery Battery # 19, approx. eight guns
 Neander Horse Artillery Battery # 12, approx. eight guns
 Brigade: General-Major Karl Georg Friedrich von Wobeser
 Ernst Fusilier Battalion # 19
 One Foot Jäger company
 Wobeser Dragoon Regiment # 14, five squadrons
 Lehmann Horse Artillery Battery # 4 (-), four 4-pound guns
 Corps de Bataille: General Karl August, Grand Duke of Saxe-Weimar-Eisenach
 1st Brigade: unknown commander
 Borstell Grenadier Battalion
 Schenck Infantry Regiment # 9, two battalions
 Winning Infantry Regiment # 23, two battalions
 2nd Brigade: unknown commander
 Hellmann Grenadier Battalion
 Treuenfels Infantry Regiment # 29, two battalions
 Strachwitz Infantry Regiment # 43, two battalions
 3rd Brigade: unknown commander
 Sobbe Fusilier Battalion # 18
 Wedell Infantry Regiment # 10, two battalions
 Tschepe Infantry Regiment # 37, two battalions
 Cavalry Brigade: unknown commander
 Bailliodz Cuirassier Regiment # 5, five squadrons
 Katte Dragoon Regiment # 4, five squadrons
 Corps Artillery: unknown commander
 Kirchfeld Foot Artillery Regiment # 16, approx. 8 guns
 Schaefer Foot Artillery Regiment # 17, approx. 8 guns
 Horse Artillery Battery # 11, four guns

Württemberg's Reserve

General Eugene Frederick Henry, Duke of Württemberg
 Strength: 16,000 total, 32 guns in batteries, 26 regimental guns
 The Reserve missed Jena-Auerstedt.
 Advance Guard Division: General-Major Johann von Hinrichs
 Borstell Fusilier Battalion # 9
 Knorr Fusilier Battalion # 12
 Hinrichs Fusilier Battalion # 17
 Hertzberg Dragoon Regiment # 9, one squadron
 Katte Dragoon Regiment # 10, one squadron
 Usedom Hussar Regiment # 10, two squadrons
 Horse Artillery Battery (-), two guns
 1st Division: General-Major Hans Christoph von Natzmer
 Schmeling Grenadier Battalion
 Crety Grenadier Battalion
 Treskow Infantry Regiment # 17, two battalions
 Kauffberg Infantry Regiment # 51, two battalions
 Natzmer Infantry Regiment # 54, two battalions
 One and one-half Foot Artillery Batteries, 12 guns
 2nd Division: General-Major Balthasar Wilhelm Christoph von Larisch (Jung-Larisch)
 Vieregg Grenadier Battalion
 Kalckreuth Infantry Regiment # 4, two battalions
 Jung-Larisch Infantry Regiment # 53, two battalions
 Manstein Infantry Regiment # 55, two battalions
 One and one-half Foot Artillery Batteries, 12 guns
 Reserve Cavalry: unknown commander
 Hertzberg Dragoon Regiment # 9, four squadrons
 Katte Dragoon Regiment # 10, four squadrons
 Usedom Hussar Regiment # 10, eight squadrons
 Horse Artillery Battery (-), six guns

Notes

References
Chandler was used almost exclusively for the French order of battle. Smith was used for the Prussian order of battle, except that Chandler's artillery compositions are given. Smith's Prussian strengths are used, which are lower than Chandler's. 
 Chandler, David G. Jena 1806: Napoleon Destroys Prussia. Westport, Conn.: Praeger Publishers, 2005. 
 Millar, Stephen. napoleon-series.org The Prussian Army at Auerstadt 14 October 1806: The Main Body
 Millar, Stephen. napoleon-series.org The Prussian Army at Auerstadt 14 October 1806: The Reserve
 Millar, Stephen. napoleon-series.org The Prussian Army at Jena 14 October 1806: The Saxons
 Millar, Stephen. napoleon-series.org Prussian Colonels-in-Chief 1792-1806: Dragoon Regiments
 Millar, Stephen. napoleon-series.org Prussian Infantry Regimental Colonels-in-Chief 1792-1806: Regiments 51-60
 Petre, F. Loraine. Napoleon's Conquest of Prussia 1806. London: Lionel Leventhal Ltd., 1993 (1907). 
  Pigeard, Alain. Dictionnaire des batailles de Napoléon. Tallandier, Bibliothèque Napoleonienne, 2004. 
 Smith, Digby. The Napoleonic Wars Data Book. London: Greenhill Books, 1998.

External references
The following websites are excellent sources for the full names of French and Prussian generals.
 Broughton, Tony. napoleon-series.org Generals Who Served in the French Army during the Period 1792-1815
  Montag, Reinhard. lexikon-deutschegenerale.de Lexikon der Deutschen Generale

Napoleonic Wars orders of battle